Bruno Mossa de Rezende (born 2 July 1986) is a Brazilian volleyball player who is currently a member of Brazil men's national volleyball team and Italian club Modena Volley.

The son of the legendary Brazilian coach Bernardo Rezende, he is one of the most accomplished setters and volleyball players in the world. His accomplishments include: 2016 Olympic Champion, double silver medalist of the Olympic Games (Beijing 2008, London 2012), 2010 World Champion, double gold medalist of the World Grand Champions Cup (2009, 2013), South American Champion (2007, 2009, 2011, 2013, 2015, 2017, 2021), multimedalist of the World League, Pan American Games, Brazilian Champion (2004, 2006, 2008, 2009, 2010, 2013), Italian Champion (2016, 2019).

Career

National team

Rezende started his career in the Brazil team in the youth teams, winning second place in the 2005 U20 World Championship. Playing for the adult team in 2007, he won the FIVB World League, the Pan American Games, the FIVB World Cup, and the South America Championship. In 2008, he participated in the Beijing Olympic Games, where Brazil won the silver medal.

In 2009, Bruno won two trophies with the national team: the World League and the Champions Cup. One year later, he won the World League for the third time and obtained his first FIVB World Championship. In 2011, he finished in second place in the World League and became a South American champion and Pan American champion. A few months later, Brazil won the bronze medal at the FIVB World Cup. In 2012, the Brazil national team once again won the silver medal at the London Olympic Games.

In 2013, Brazil finished in second place at the World League and won two gold medals in the South American Championship and the FIVB World Grand Champions Cup. The setter started the 2014 season with the silver medal in the FIVB World League and a silver medal in the dramatic final with Poland in FIVB World Championship. In 2015, Brazil won the gold medal in the American Championship. In the 2016 Rio Olympic Games, Brazil won a gold medal after the final match against Italy, and Bruno was named the best setter of the tournament.

Personal life
Bruno is the only child of former volleyball players Bernardinho and Vera Mossa. His mother took part in Olympics three times (1980, 1984, 1988). His father is a silver medalist with the 1984 Olympic Games and former coach of Brazil men's national volleyball team. His parents divorced when he was a child. From his mother's first marriage to basketball player Éder Mundt Leme, Bruno has an older half-brother, Edson (born 1981). From her third marriage, he has a younger half-sister, Luisa. From his father's second marriage to former volleyball player Fernanda Venturini, Bruno has two younger half-sisters, Júlia (born 2002) and Victória (born 2009).

Bruno often faced accusations of nepotism when he first started playing for Brazil's national volleyball team since his father, Bernardinho, was the team's coach from 2001 to 2017. However, both he and his father have vehemently defended themselves against the accusations and were always backed up by the other players, who said Bernardinho was tougher and more demanding of Bruno because of their family ties.

Bruno is close friends with footballer Neymar.

Sporting achievements

Clubs

FIVB Club World Championship
  2018 – with Cucine Lube Civitanova
  2019 – with Cucine Lube Civitanova

CEV Champions League
  2019 – with Cucine Lube Civitanova

South American Club Championship
  2009 – with Cimed Florianópolis

National championships
 2003/2004  Brazilian Championship, with Unisul Florianópolis
 2005/2006  Brazilian Championship, with Cimed Florianópolis
 2007/2008  Brazilian Championship, with Cimed Florianópolis
 2008/2009  Brazilian Championship, with Cimed Florianópolis
 2009/2010  Brazilian Championship, with Cimed Florianópolis
 2012/2013  Brazilian Championship, with RJX
 2014/2015  Italian Cup, with Modena Volley
 2015/2016  Italian SuperCup, with DHL Modena
 2015/2016  Italian Cup, with DHL Modena
 2015/2016  Italian Championship, with DHL Modena
 2018/2019  Italian Championship, with Cucine Lube Civitanova
 2019/2020  Italian Cup, with Cucine Lube Civitanova

National team
 2005  FIVB U19 World Championship
 2007  America's Cup
 2007  South American Championship
 2007  Pan American Games
 2007  FIVB World Cup
 2008  America's Cup
 2008  Olympic Games
 2009  FIVB World League
 2009  South American Championship
 2009  FIVB World Grand Champions Cup
 2010  FIVB World League
 2010  FIVB World Championship
 2011  FIVB World League
 2011  South American Championship
 2011  Pan American Games
 2011  FIVB World Cup
 2012  Olympic Games
 2013  FIVB World League
 2013  South American Championship
 2013  FIVB World Grand Champions Cup
 2014  FIVB World League
 2014  FIVB World Championship
 2015  South American Championship
 2016  FIVB World League
 2016  Olympic Games
 2017  FIVB World Grand Champions Cup
 2017  FIVB World League
 2017  South American Championship
 2018  FIVB World Championship
 2019  FIVB World Cup
 2021  Nations League
 2021  South American Championship

Individual
 2006 Superliga Brasileira – Best Setter
 2007 Superliga Brasileira – Best Setter
 2007 America's Cup – Best Setter
 2008 Superliga Brasileira – Best Setter
 2008 America's Cup – Best Setter
 2009 Superliga Brasileira – Best Setter
 2009 FIVB World Grand Champions Cup – Best Setter
 2013 FIVB World League – Best Setter
 2013 South American Championship – Best Setter
 2013 FIVB World Grand Champions Cup – Best Setter
 2015 South American Championship – Best Setter
 2016 Olympic Games – Best Setter
 2017 South American Championship – Best Setter
 2019 FIVB Club World Championship – Most Valuable Player
 2019 FIVB Club World Championship – Best Setter
 2021 South American Championship – Most Valuable Player and Best Setter

References

External links

 Bruno Mossa de Rezende at the Italian Volleyball League
 
 Bruno Rezende at the International Volleyball Federation
 
 
 

1986 births
Living people
Olympic silver medalists for Brazil
Olympic volleyball players of Brazil
Volleyball players at the 2008 Summer Olympics
Volleyball players at the 2012 Summer Olympics
Volleyball players at the 2007 Pan American Games
Volleyball players at the 2011 Pan American Games
Volleyball players from Rio de Janeiro (city)
Olympic medalists in volleyball
Brazilian men's volleyball players
Medalists at the 2012 Summer Olympics
Medalists at the 2008 Summer Olympics
Pan American Games gold medalists for Brazil
Volleyball players at the 2016 Summer Olympics
Medalists at the 2016 Summer Olympics
Olympic gold medalists for Brazil
Brazilian expatriates in Italy
Expatriate volleyball players in Italy
Modena Volley players
Pan American Games medalists in volleyball
Medalists at the 2011 Pan American Games
Medalists at the 2007 Pan American Games
Volleyball players at the 2020 Summer Olympics
Setters (volleyball)
21st-century Brazilian people